Georges Louis Condominas (29 June 1921 – 17 July 2011) was a French cultural anthropologist, known for his field studies of the Mnong people of Vietnam.

Biography
Condominas was born in 1921 in Haiphong (former French Indochina, Vietnam today). His father was a French officer in the colonial army and his mother has Chinese, Vietnamese and Portuguese ancestry. He died in the night of Saturday to Sunday 17 July 2011 from a heart attack at the hôpital Broca in Paris where he had been hospitalized for some time.

Education
Georges Condominas studied at the Lycée Lakanal, on the southern outskirts of Paris, but kept in touch with his father through letters and photographs. After he graduated, he studied law in France. He then returned to Indochina to work in the colonial administration but gave up his job and studied art in Hanoi. During the Japanese occupation he was imprisoned at the Mikado Hotel.

After World War II, he studied ethnology and returned to France to follow the lectures of famous professors of the time such as André Leroi-Gourhan, Denise Paulme or Marcel Griaule at the Musée de l'Homme, and Maurice Leenhardt at the École pratique des hautes études in Paris.

The field of Sar Luk, Vietnam
One of his first ethnologic field is in a Vietnamese village called Sar Luk in the province of Dac Lac. From this experience, he wrote two books:
The first one is entitled We have eaten the forest in 1957. It is noticed by Claude Lévi-Strauss and Edouard Glissant for its literary qualities.
The second one is entitled L'exotique est quotidien (1965) but hasn't been translated into English so far.

Researches and missions
After this first major field, he studies other fields in Madagascar, Togo and fulfills several missions in Thailand, Laos and Cambodia for the Unesco.

In 1960, he becomes professor at the École pratique des hautes études in Paris and creates the CeDRASEMI, a French research center focused on South East Asian and the Insulindian world, in 1962.

Condominas is Visiting Professor at Columbia University and Yale University between 1963 and 1969. He is Fellow of the Center for Advanced Studies in the Behavioral Sciences of Palo Alto in 1971. He pronounce in 1972 the Distinguish Lecture of the annual session of the American Anthropological Association, where he denounce the Vietnam War and the ethnocide of the Mnong. He was a closed friend of Margaret Mead, John Embree and Elisabeth Wiswell Embree.
He is considered as a master of ethnology in Japan, where he was the first foreigner ever to pronounce a speech at the Nihon Minzoku Gakkai, a Japanese anthropological association, for its 50th anniversary.

He is also invited at the Australian National University in 1987 and at the Japanese university of Sophia in 1992.

His work inspired many books and movies. The record he made of the Mnong music can be heard at the end of Francis Ford Coppola's Apocalypse Now, the final scene of which was inspired by Condominas's description of the ritual slaughter of buffalo.

For the opening of the Musée du quai Branly in 2006, an exhibition is devoted to him and his field of Sar Luk. The exhibition was also presented the next year, in 2007, in Hanoï, Vietnam, with a bilingual catalog.
Today, his working papers, his personal library and his pictures are preserved at the mediatheque of the Musée du quai Branly, available for scholars and researchers. His audio records are preserved and digitized by the French Research Center for Ethnomusicology (LESC, CNRS, Paris Ouest University).

Usage of his work by the US in the Vietnam war
Condominas declared that the US Department of Commerce delivered his research on Vietnam to US soldiers. In violation of international copyright laws, his works were translated to English. He obtained this information to one of his research participants, who was tortured previously by the US.

Main Publications

Books
Nous avons mangé la forêt de la Pierre-Génie Gôo (Hii saa Brii Mau-Yaang Gôo). Chronique de Sar Luk, village mnong gar (tribu proto-indochinoise des Hauts-Plateaux du Viet-nam central), Paris, Mercure de France, 1954 (2nd edition 1974, 2003; paperback edition Flammarion, 1982; transl. Italian, Milan, 1960; Russian, Moscow, 1968; German, Frankfurt, 1969; English, New York, Harmondsworth, 1977 and republished New York and Tokyo, 1994; Japanese, Tokyo, 1993; Vietnamese, Hanoi, 2003; Hungarian, Budapest, in preparation).
L' Exotique est quotidien, Sar Luk, Vietnam central, Paris, Plon, 1965 (Collection Terre humaine) (2nd edition 1977; transl. Spanish with preface by Manuel Delgado, Barcelona, 1992).
Fokon 'olona et collectivités rurales en Imerina, preface by Hubert Deschamps, Paris, Berger-Levrault, 1960, 234 p., cov. ill map; bibliog. p. 23 1–234 (L’homme d’Outre-Mer. Nouvelle série. 3) (2nd edition ORSTOM, 1991).
L’Espace social. A propos de l’Asie du Sud-Est, Paris, Flammarion, 1980 (transl. Vietnamese, Hanoi, 1997). Republication underway by Editions Les Indes savantes.
From Lawa to Mon, from Saa' to Thai: historical and anthropological aspects of Southeast Asian social spaces, transl. by Stephanie Anderson, Maria Magannon and Gehan Wijeyewardene, Canberra, Department of Anthropology, Research School of Pacific Studies, Australian National University, 1990, VI-114 p., ill., maps, plan, photographs; glossary (An occasional paper of the department of anthropology, in association with the Thai-Yunnan project).
L 'Espace social = Raya thaang sangkhôm, Bangkok, Cahiers de France, 1991 (transl. Thai by Chatchada Ratanasamakarn and Sumitra Baffie).
Le Bouddhisme au village = Val sonna bot: notes ethnographiques sur les pratiques religieuses dans la société rurale lao (plaine de Vientiane), Vientiane, Cahiers de France, 1998 (transl. Laotian by Saveng Phinith).

Editorship of collective works
Agriculture et societies en Asie du Sud-Est, Etudes rurales, 53–56, Jan.-Dec. 1974 (co-edited with J. Barrau, L. Bernot and I. Chiva).
L’Anthropologie en France: situation actuelle et avenir. Acts of the international colloquium organized at the CNRS by G. Condominas and S. Dreyfus-Ganielon, 18–22 April 1977, Paris, CNRS, 1979.
Disciplines croisées: hommage à Bernard Philippe Groslier, Paris EHESS, 1992 (co-edited by D. Bernot, M.-A. Martin and M. Zaini-Lajoubert).
Les Réfugiés originaires de l’Asie du Sud-Est: rapport au Président de la République, Paris, La Documentation française, 2 vol. 1982–1984 (CeDRASEMI collective report, edited in collaboration with R. Pottier, duplicated in 1981).
Formes extrêmes de dépendance: contributions à l’étude de l’esclavage en Asie du Sud- Est, Paris, EHESS, 1998 (co-edited with M.-A. Martin and J. Ivanof).

Filmography
Sar Luk: les travaux et les jours d’un village mnong gar du Vietnam central, film directed by Georges Condominas and Aiain Bedos based on photos, sung poems collected between 1948 and 1950, and music recorded in 1958 and 1984 (English version translated by Maria Pilar Luna-Magannon).
[Sar Luk: toils and days of a Mnong Gar village in Central Vietnam: [synopsis], transl. by Maria Pilar Luna-Magannon, film, CNRS-CeDRASEMI, 1984, 14 ff. dact.]
L’Exotique est quotidien: retour à Sar Luk, directed by Jean Lallier, 16:9 digital telefilm, 16:9 satellite broadcast by France Télévision, VHS videocassette, 52 min., Paris, ADAV / Europe images, Les Films d’ici, Paris, 1996, broadcast by France 2, 1997.
Nous avons mangé la forêt..., film directed by par Georges Condominas and Jean Lallier, VHS videocassette, 80 min., Le Vidéographe, Université de Toulouse-Le Mirail / Les Films d’ici co-production, 1999.
Le Sacrifice du buffle, film directed by Georges Condominas and Jean Lallier, VHS videocassette, 50 min., Le Vidéographe, Université de Toulouse-Le Mirail / Les Films d’ici co-production, 1999.

Discography
Musique mnong gar du Vietnam (anthologie de musique proto-indochinoise, vol. 1), Paris, OCORA, 1974, 30 cm LP, text by G. Condominas, 10 p. in French and English, notes and bibliog., 12 black-and-white photos, 1 color photo, 1 map (Musée de l’Homme collection, OCORA OCR 80/ ORTF).
Vietnam: musique des montagnards, le Chant du Monde, CNR 2741085.86, 1997 (Collections of the CNRS and the Musée de l’Homme) [CDI, Jörai (1), Lac (14, 15, 16); CDII, Khmu, 1973 (19, 20, 21)].

References

Further reading 

 Goudineau, Yves (2019). « Conscience métisse et ethnographie minoritaire. Georges Condominas face à la désintégration coloniale et à la guerre du Vietnam », in Christine Laurière et André Mary (dir.), Ethnologues en situations coloniales, Les Carnets de Bérose n° 11, Paris, BEROSE - International Encyclopaedia of the Histories of Anthropology, pp. 206–237.

External links 

 Resources related to research : BEROSE - International Encyclopaedia of the Histories of Anthropology. "Condominas, Georges (1921-2011)", Paris, 2019. (ISSN 2648-2770)

1921 births
2011 deaths
French anthropologists
French people of Vietnamese descent
Lycée Lakanal alumni
People from Haiphong
Vietnamese people of French descent